The Tārīkh-e ʿĀlam-ārā-ye ʿAbbāsī recorded the history of the Iranian Safavid dynasty, from its founding under Shah Ismail I to the end, under Shah Abbas I, covering the period of 1600–1680. The book was written by the special secretary and counsellor  to the Safavid court of Shah Abbas I, Eskandar Beg Munshi who had been an eyewitness to most of the events or consulted other eyewitnesses.

This book documents the entire history of Shah Abbas I. He covered Shah Safi in a separate book called Tārīkh-e Jahān-ārā-ye ʿAbbāsī were published separately.

See also
Ottoman–Persian Wars

References

Further reading
 
 
 

Safavid Iran
History books about Iran

Persian-language books
17th-century history books
History books about the 17th century